Elbasan is a city in central Albania.

Elbasan may also refer to:

 Elbasan County, an administrative county surrounding Vlorë
 Elbasan District, a former administrative district surrounding Vlorë
 Sanjak of Elbasan, an administrative division in the Ottoman Empire
 Elbasan Gospel Manuscript
 Elbasan script